Ansorge's brush-furred rat (Lophuromys ansorgei) is a species of rodent in the family Muridae. It was identified in 1896 by de Winton as L. ansorgei. However, it was widely regarded as L. sicapusi until 2000, when Walter Verheyen, Theo Dierckx, and Jan Hulselmans published a study to the Bulletin of the Royal Belgian Institute of Natural Sciences describing it as a distinct species.

Distribution
The distribution of the species is not fully known. According to the study by W. Verheyen et al., the species is found in West Africa from the lower reaches of the Congo River in Eastern Democratic Republic of the Congo and in East Africa from Uganda through Western Kenya to Northern Tanzania. However it remains to be seen whether L. ansorgei extends from East Africa along the northern and southern rim of the Congolese Central Forest Block to the lower reaches of the Congo River, or the range along the lower Congo is a historical range of the species.

Taxonomy
The species was first identified as L. ansorgei in Mumias, Nyanza Province in 1896. It is usually included in L. sicapusi, but W. Verheyen et al. consider it as a distinct species in their study. L. manteufeli (Matschie, 1911) and L. pyrrhus (Heller, 1911) are considered synonyms of L. ansorgei by Mammal Species of the World.

Notes

References

Lophuromys
Mammals described in 1896